Prunus × orthosepala is a nothospecies of shrubby plum native to North America, in the southern and central United States. It is a naturally occurring hybrid of Chickasaw plum, Prunus angustifolia, and American plum, Prunus americana, found where their ranges overlap.

References

External links
 

orthosepala
Hybrid prunus
Flora of the United States
orthosepala
Plants described in 1893
Plant nothospecies